Heteropacha is a monotypic moth genus in the family Lasiocampidae described by Leon F. Harvey in 1874. Its only species, Heteropacha rileyana, or Riley's lappet moth, was described by the same author in the same year. It can be found in the US states of Mississippi, Missouri, Texas and Georgia.

The wingspan is 27–36 mm. The moths are on wing from late April to August.

The larvae feed on Gleditsia triacanthos.

References

External links

Butterflies and Moths of North America
Species info

Lasiocampidae
Moths of North America
Monotypic moth genera

Moths described in 1874
Taxa named by Leon F. Harvey